PORB may refer to:
Beta-porphyranase, an enzyme
Corynebacterial porin B, a protein